Ali Imran Zaidi (born 27 September 1994) is a Pakistani professional all-rounder cricketer and businessman. He is a right-hand batsman and a right-arm spin bowler.

Ali is a professional cricket player who played for both national and international matches. He represented the Pakistan Customs cricket team as a Captain and SSGC cricket team in Quaid-e-Azam Trophy. He also played for the Northern cricket team in Patron's Trophy, Pakistan Cup and National T20 Cup in Pakistan. In 2022, he played for the SGD Club in Sharjah T20 Cup in the UAE.

References

1994 births
Living people
Pakistani cricketers
Islamabad cricketers
Pakistan Customs cricketers
Sui Southern Gas Company cricketers
Cricketers from Islamabad